Jason Ginsburg is an American actor, author and producer. A former tour guide at Universal Studios Hollywood, he is best known as the creator of @FakeThemePark, a comedy Twitter and Facebook account that satirizes the theme park industry. Ginsburg used tweets from @FakeThemePark as the basis for his 2018 book, If The Princess Rolls Her Eyes, Your Wish Will Come True.

@FakeThemePark has been noted by Frommer's ("Hilarious"), Orlando Sentinel ("Sharp and on the nose"), LAist ("Best roasts of the theme park industry"), MiceChat ("Magically funny"), and Attractions Magazine ("Insightful jabs at Disney and Universal"), and other theme park blogs, websites, and podcasts.

Ginsburg studied film and theatre at the University of Southern California. He co-produced and co-starred in Padmé, which won the 2008 George Lucas Selects Award at The Official Star Wars Fan Film Awards. He produced Ask the Astronaut, a Science Channel original web series in which Mike Massimino shared his experiences of space travel. He co-wrote, co-produced, and performed in Tales of Tinder, a comedy/reality web series for Playboy. Ginsburg also co-wrote Age of Stone and Sky: The Sorcerer Beast, a low-budget fantasy film with Corey Feldman and Jeffrey Combs, coming out in 2020.

References

External links 
 

Living people
1974 births
University of Southern California alumni